Sciara del Fuoco is a talus scree or depression located on Stromboli Island in Italy. It runs along the island's northern flank and is bounded by two ridges. It now serves as a major tourist attraction on the island.

Formation 

Sciara del Fuoco was formed as a result of a sector collapse around 5,000 years ago. Due to this, it is sometimes referred to as a scar. It was formed by lava, lapilli and incandescent waste.

References 

Volcanoes of Italy
Stromboli